Strange Behavior is an album by Animotion released by Casablanca Records. It was the last album to be released by Casablanca before the record label folded.

The single "I Engineer" hit #2 in Germany and #6 in Switzerland in 1986.  The single "I Want You" hit #27 in Germany and #84 in the United States. The album went to #21 in Switzerland and reached #71 on the Billboard 200 chart.

Track listing
 "I Want You" (Rick Neigher, Bill Wadhams) – 4:35
 "I Engineer" (Mike Chapman, Holly Knight, Bernie Taupin) – 4:13
 "Strange Behavior" (Don Kirkpatrick, Randy Sharp) – 3:55
 "Stealing Time" (Sue Shifrin, Wadhams) – 3:54
 "Anxiety" (John Davis, Kirkpatrick, Dennis Morgan) – 4:11
 "Out of Control" (Greg Smith, Louie Stone) – 3:28
 "Stranded" (Smith, Stone) – 3:19
 "The Essence" (Wadhams) – 4:06
 "One Step Ahead" (Smith, Stone) – 3:36
 "Staring Down the Demons" (Kirkpatrick, Sharp) – 4:12

Personnel
Animotion
 Astrid Plane – vocals
 Bill Wadhams – vocals, keyboards, guitars
 Greg Smith – keyboards, gang vocals 
 Don Kirkpatrick – guitars, gang vocals
 Charles Ottavio – bass guitar, gang vocals 
 Jim Blair – drums, percussion

Additional personnel
 Gary Chang – synthesizers
 Tad Wadhams – fretless bass
 Mike Baird – drums

Production
 Richie Zito – producer, arrangements 
 Animotion – arrangements
 Michael Frondelli – engineer (1)
 David Leonard – engineer (2–10), mixing 
 Brian Reeves – engineer (2–10)
 David Concors – additional engineer 
 Peggy Leonard – additional engineer 
 Howie Weinberg – mastering at Masterdisk (New York City, New York)
 Matthew Rolston – photography 
 Bill Levy – art direction 
 Vigon/Seireeni – art direction

Chart performance
The album spent 14 weeks on the U.S. Billboard 200 album charts and reached its peak position of #71 in April 1986.

Singles

References

1986 albums
Animotion albums
Albums produced by Richie Zito
Casablanca Records albums